Howz-e Seyyed Morad (also Romanized as Ḩowẕ-e Seyyed Morād and Howz-e Seyyed Morād; also known as Deh-e Seyyed Morād) is a village in Sharvineh Rural District, Kalashi District, Javanrud County, Kermanshah Province, Iran. At the 2006 census, its population was 96, in 20 families.

References 

Populated places in Javanrud County